Dr. Salik Ram Govind is a Fijian politician and former Member of the Parliament of Fiji for the FijiFirst Party. He was elected to Parliament in the 2018 election. He did not run for re-election in 2022 Election.

References

Living people
Indian members of the Parliament of Fiji
FijiFirst politicians
Fijian civil servants
Politicians from Nadroga-Navosa Province
Year of birth missing (living people)